Ornativalva longiductella is a moth of the family Gelechiidae. It was described by Sattler in 1967. It is found in Algeria, Tunisia, Sudan, Iraq, Afghanistan and Mongolia.

Adults have been recorded on wing from February to April, in June, July and October.

References

Moths described in 1967
Ornativalva